Edwardstone is a village and civil parish in the Babergh district, in the county of Suffolk, England. The parish contains the hamlets of Mill Green, Priory Green, Round Maple and Sherbourne Street, and Edwardstone Woods, a Site of Special Scientific Interest. The parish touches Boxford, Great Waldingfield, Groton, Little Waldingfield, Milden and Newton.

History 
The name "Edwardstone" means 'Eadweard's farm/settlement'. Edwardstone was listed in the Domesday Book as Eduardestuna.
Edwardstone Priory was a priory in Priory Green and was founded by Peter, Bishop of Winchester during the reign of King John, the priory was a cell to Abingdon monastery, before the monks resident were moved to Colne Priory. The priory may be the origin of the place name "Priory Green".

The village was the birthplace of John Winthrop, one of the founders of the Massachusetts Bay Colony.

Historical writings
In 1870–72, John Marius Wilson's Imperial Gazetteer of England and Wales described the village as:

In 1887, John Bartholomew also wrote an entry on Edwardstone in the Gazetteer of the British Isles with a much shorter description:

Listed buildings 
There are 31 listed buildings in Edwardstone, some include:
Edwardstone's parish church, St Mary's, is a Grade I listed building.
Mill Green has 9 Grade II listed buildings, all timber-framed and plastered houses, Crossways, Earls Cottages, General Stores, Mill Green Cottage, Mill Green End, Moat Farm Cottage, Sans Souci, The Thatched Cottage and Tudor Cottage.
Priory Green contains 5 Grade II listed buildings, the Barn to the North of Lynn's Hall, Lynn's Hall, Priory Cottage, Priory Farmhouse and Priory Green Cottage.
There are 4 Grade II listed buildings in Round Maple, all timber-framed and plastered: Flushing Farm, an 18th or early 19th century building; Little Thatch, a renovated 17th to 18th century single-storey building; Quicks Farm, a house with a red brick front, gable ends; and Seasons, a single-storey thatched building with attics.

Notable residents
John Hoskyns (1927-2014), Policy Advisor to Margaret Thatcher while head of the Prime Minister's Policy Unit from May 1979 and April 1982.
Thomas Browne, (1889-1978), Archdeacon of Ipswich from 1946  until 1963 and honorary canon at St Edmundsbury Cathedral from 1936 to 1946.
Henry Lowry-Corry (1845–1927), Colonel in the British Army, Conservative politician, and Member of Parliament (MP) for County Tyrone 1873–1880. 
William Ward, 1st Earl of Dudley (1817-1885), landowner and benefactor.
Joseph Brand (MP), (1605-1674), merchant, landowner, Member of Parliament for Sudbury in 1660
John Winthrop, (1587/88-1649), Puritan lawyer and one of the leading figures in founding the Massachusetts Bay Colony.

References

External links

Parish Council website
St Mary's Church at Suffolkchurches.co.uk
Edwardstone on the National Historic List for England

 
Villages in Suffolk
Civil parishes in Suffolk
Babergh District